Raddery is a small village, which is located with the former estate of Raddery House, in the Black Isle in Ross-shire, Scottish Highlands and is in the Scottish council area of Highland.

Populated places on the Black Isle